The wrestling competitions at the 2024 Summer Olympics in Paris are scheduled to run from 5 to 11 August at Grand Palais Éphémère in Champ de Mars. 288 wrestlers are expected to compete across eighteen different weight categories at these Games. The men will wrestle against each other in both freestyle and Greco-Roman events, whereas the women will only participate in the freestyle wrestling, with eighteen gold medals awarded. Wrestling has been contested at every modern Summer Olympic Games, except Paris 1900.

Competition format
Sixteen wrestlers compete in each division. The competition consists of a single-elimination tournament, with a repechage used to determine the winner of two bronze medals. The two finalists will wrestle for the gold and silver medals. Each wrestler losing to one of the two finalists moves into the repechage that culminates in a pair of bronze medal matches featuring the semifinal losers who each face the remaining repechage opponent from their half of the bracket.

Qualification

Similar to the previous Games, 288 wrestling quota places are available through three competition phases for Paris 2024. Each NOC could only send one wrestler per weight class. As the host country, France reserves two coveted spots across three different styles. 

The qualification period commences at the 2023 World Wrestling Championships, scheduled for late August or early September in Belgrade, Serbia, where five quota places for each of the eighteen weight categories will be awarded to the four medalists (gold, silver, and two bronze) and the champion of a bout between two losers from the bronze-medal matches. At the beginning of the 2024 season, four continental qualification tournaments (Asia, Europe, the Americas, and the joint Africa & Oceania) will distribute a total of 144 spots to the top two finalists of each continent across eighteen weight categories. The remainder of the total quota will be decided at the 2024 World Qualification Tournament, offering three quota places per weight category to the two highest-ranked wrestlers and the champion of a wrestle-off between two bronze medalists.

Competition schedule

Medal summary

Medal table

Medalists

Men's freestyle

Men's Greco-Roman

Women's freestyle

See also
Wrestling at the 2022 Asian Games
Wrestling at the 2023 Pan American Games

References

 
2024
2024 Summer Olympics events
2024 in sport wrestling